John Chad Allen (born February 6, 1975) is an American former professional baseball left fielder. He played in Major League Baseball (MLB) for the Minnesota Twins, Cleveland Indians, Florida Marlins and Texas Rangers.

Career
Born in Dallas, Texas, his father was Jackie Allen, a cornerback in the National Football League. He attended Duncanville High School and played college baseball for Texas A&M University from 1994 to 1996. He was drafted by the Minnesota Twins in the fourth round of the 1996 Major League Baseball Draft. Allen also served as a member of the United States national baseball team in the 1996 Summer Olympics.

After seven games in 1996, Allen began his first full professional season with the Fort Myers Miracle, where he had a .305 batting average over 105 games. He was then promoted to the New Britain Rock Cats, where he spent the rest of 1997 and the entire 1998 season. In 1998, he had a .262 batting average, 82 runs batted in (RBI), and 21 stolen bases. After spring training, he made the opening day roster for the 1999 Minnesota Twins season, and spent the year as the team's starting left fielder. In 137 games, Allen had a .277 batting average, 10 home runs, and 14 stolen bases. He spent most of 2000 with the Salt Lake Buzz, and played 15 games in the majors. After 57 games with the Twins in 2001, he tore his ACL in August which ended his season; the Twins released him during the offseason.

For the rest of his career, Allen remained mostly in the minor leagues. In 2002, he played five games for the Cleveland Indians. In 2003, he played 12 games for the Florida Marlins, and he played a combined 41 games over two seasons for the Texas Rangers; his last major league game was June 2, 2005. At the start of the 2006 season, the Kansas City Royals assigned him to the Omaha Royals of the Pacific Coast League (PCL), where he had a .314 batting average in 105 games.

In 2007, Allen played for the Orix Buffaloes of Nippon Professional Baseball. On December 13, 2007, he was named in the Mitchell Report, naming players who had used steroids. His playing career ended after that. From 2013-2014, Allen served as the hitting coach for the New Britain Rock Cats, the Twins's AA minor league affiliate. In 2015, he was a coach for the Chattanooga Lookouts.

See also
 List of Major League Baseball players named in the Mitchell Report

References

External links

1975 births
Living people
Albuquerque Isotopes players
American expatriate baseball players in Canada
American expatriate baseball players in Japan
Baseball players at the 1996 Summer Olympics
Baseball coaches from Texas
Baseball players from Dallas
Buffalo Bisons (minor league) players
Cleveland Indians players
Edmonton Trappers players
Florida Marlins players
Fort Wayne Wizards players
Major League Baseball designated hitters
Major League Baseball left fielders
Medalists at the 1996 Summer Olympics
Memphis Redbirds players
Minnesota Twins players
Nippon Professional Baseball outfielders
Oklahoma RedHawks players
Omaha Royals players
Olympic bronze medalists for the United States in baseball
Orix Buffaloes players
People from Duncanville, Texas
Rochester Red Wings players
Texas A&M Aggies baseball players
Texas Rangers players
Duncanville High School alumni